McGibbon is a surname of Scottish and Irish origin. It is a Anglicized form of Gaelic Mac Giobúin, a patronymic from a pet form of the personal name Gilbert. People with this surname include:

Adam McGibbon, Northern Irish environmentalist and writer
Charlie McGibbon (1880–1954), Arsenal and Southampton footballer (father of Doug McGibbon)
Doug McGibbon (1919–2002), Southampton, Fulham and Bournemouth footballer
Ian McGibbon (born 1947), New Zealand military historian
Josann McGibbon, screenwriter 
Lewis McGibbon, English cricketer
Pat McGibbon (born 1973), a former Northern Ireland international footballer
Pauline Mills McGibbon (1910–2001),  the 22nd Lieutenant-Governor of Ontario
Sheila McGibbon (1921–1997), an Irish stage, radio and television actress
William McGibbon (1690–1756), a Scottish composer and violinist

See also
MacGibbon
Gibbs